Mark O'Halloran (born 6 March 1981) is a former professional rugby league footballer who played for the Wests Tigers and the Penrith Panthers in the NRL, and the London Broncos in the ESL. His junior club was Burwood United in the Balmain District Competition.

Background
O'Halloran was born in Sydney, New South Wales, Australia.

Playing career
O'Halloran made his NRL début for Wests Tigers in 2001 and played 28 first grade games, mostly as a centre. In 2004, O'Halloran moved to England, where he played in the Super League for the London Broncos.

O'Halloran returned to Australia from England and played for the Penrith Panthers in the NRL.

O'Halloran played in the USA international team having played one game in 2007.

Post playing
Since retiring, O'Halloran has become a PD/H/PE teacher and currently works at St Patrick's College, Strathfield.

References

External links
Penrith Panthers profile
NRL stats
NRL points
Hunslet 4–70 London

1981 births
Living people
Australian people of American descent
Australian people of Irish descent
Australian rugby league players
Australian schoolteachers
London Broncos players
Penrith Panthers players
People educated at St Aloysius' College (Sydney)
Rugby league centres
Rugby league players from Sydney
Rugby league wingers
United States national rugby league team players
Wests Tigers players
Windsor Wolves players